Gary Brown (born 1 November 1980) is a professional rugby union player. Brown attended Blackrock College and later played for Blackrock College RFC.

Leinster career
Brown made his first start for Leinster in 2003, in the Celtic League, in the 29-22 loss to Celtic Warriors at Sardis Road. Brown would go on to earn 43 caps in the competition, playing in the positions of fullback, center and wing, scoring 11 tries. Brown then played in his first Heineken Cup game in the 9-25 win against Treviso in Italy in 2004. It was the first of 4 caps, before he opened up his try tally with a brilliant touchdown against Bourgoin in Lansdowne Road.

Following Leinster's Heineken Cup win in May 2009 Brown announced his retirement from professional rugby to concentrate on his studies. He is currently playing for Wanderers FC.

External links
Brown's Leinster Profile
Leinster Rugby

References

Ireland international rugby sevens players
1980 births
Living people
Rugby union wings
Irish rugby union players
Leinster Rugby players
Blackrock College RFC players
University College Dublin R.F.C. players
Alumni of University College Dublin
People educated at Blackrock College